Dering station is a flag stop in Dering, Manitoba, Canada.  The station is served by Via Rail's Winnipeg – Churchill train.

Footnotes

External links 
Via Rail Station Information

Via Rail stations in Manitoba